Italy competed at the 1983 European Athletics Indoor Championships in Budapest, Hungary, from 5 to 6 March 1983.

Medalists

Top eight
Nine Italian athletes reached the top eight in this edition of the championships.
Men

Women

See also
 Italy national athletics team

References

External links
 EAA official site 

1983
1983 European Athletics Indoor Championships
1983 in Italian sport